This is a list of chapters of the Records of the Grand Historian (Shiji), written by the Han dynasty historian Sima Qian.

In all, the Records is about 526,000 Chinese characters long, making it four times longer than Thucydides' History of the Peloponnesian War, and longer than the Old Testament.
Sima Qian organized the chapters of Records of the Grand Historian into five categories,  each comprising a section of the book: Annals, Tables, Treatises, Hereditary Houses, and Ranked Biographies.

Annals

Benji (本紀, annals), 12 volumes. Royal biographies in strict annalistic form that offer an overview of the most important events, especially from the time of the Zhou dynasty to that of the emperor of the Han dynasty.

Tables

Biao (表, tables), 10 tables: overview of the reigns of the successive lords of the feudal states from the time of the Zhou dynasty till that of the early Han. At the same time the most important events of their reigns are mentioned.

Treatises

Shu (書, treatises), 8 volumes. Each treatise describes an area of state interest.

Genealogies

Shijia (世家, genealogies), 30 volumes. Descriptions in chronicle form of the events of the states from the time of the Zhou Dynasty until the early Han Dynasty and of eminent people.

Biographies

Liezhuan (列傳, exemplary lives, often called biographies), 70 volumes. Biographies of important people. The biographies are limited to the description of the events that show the exemplary character of the subject, but in the Shiji is often supplemented with legends. One biography can treat two or more people if they are considered to belong to the same type. The last biographies describe the relations between the Chinese and the neighboring peoples.

Afterword

The last important section features an afterword that includes an autobiography by Sima Qian. He explains in it why and under what circumstances he wrote the Shiji.

References

Han dynasty texts
Han dynasty literature
2nd-century BC history books
1st-century BC history books
Chinese history texts
Historiography of China
Chinese chronicles